Tesilimi Olawale Ayinde "Teslim" Balogun (1927 – 30 July 1972) was a Nigerian football player and coach. Balogun played at both professional and international levels as a striker, before becoming Africa's first qualified professional football coach.

Playing career
Educated in Port Harcourt and graduating from St. Mary's Catholic School, Balogun played in his native Nigeria for a number of teams, including Apapa Bombers, Marine Athletics, UAC XI, Railways XI, Jos XI, Pan Bank Team, Dynamos Club and SCOA XI. During his time in Nigeria, Balogun won the Challenge Cup a total of five times in seven finals. He was the first player to have a hat-trick in the competition, in Pan Bank's 6–1 rout of Warri in 1953.

After originally touring with a Nigerian select team in 1949, Balogun returned to the UK in August 1955 to sign with Peterborough United. However, Balogun never made a league appearance for Peterborough, and spent time with Skegness Town before signing with Queens Park Rangers, scoring 3 goals in 13 appearances in the Football League during the 1956–57 season. After leaving QPR, Balogun returned to non-League football, playing with Holbeach United.

Balogun was also a member of the Nigerian national side for 12 years.

Coaching career
Balogun became the first African to qualify as a professional coach. He was a coach for Nigeria at the 1968 Summer Olympics.

Legacy
The Teslim Balogun Stadium in the Nigerian city of Lagos is named in his honour. The Teslim Balogun Foundation was founded after his death to assist the families of Nigerian ex-international footballers who may have fallen on hard times.

Personal life
Balogun was nicknamed "Thunder" because of his powerful shot, and was also known as "Balinga" for a similar reason. During his time touring schools to coach youngesters, he was nicknamed "Baba Ball."

Balogun died in his sleep on 30 July 1972, at the age of 45. He had eight children.

References

1927 births
1972 deaths
Yoruba sportspeople
Nigerian footballers
Nigeria international footballers
Peterborough United F.C. players
Skegness Town A.F.C. players
Queens Park Rangers F.C. players
Holbeach United F.C. players
English Football League players
Association football forwards
Association football coaches
Nigerian expatriate footballers
Nigerian expatriates in England
Expatriate footballers in England